The Borough of Kerang was a local government area in north-western Victoria, Australia.

History

Kerang was originally part of the Swan Hill Road District, which covered most of north-western Victoria, and was incorporated in 1862, becoming a shire on 14 August 1871. After several other areas severed from the shire, it was renamed the Shire of Kerang on 31 December 1898. The area around Kerang was incorporated as the Borough of Kerang on 1 April 1966.

On 20 January 1995, the Borough of Kerang was abolished, and along with the Shires of Cohuna and Kerang, was merged into the newly created Shire of Gannawarra.

Wards
The Borough of Kerang was not divided into wards, and its nine councillors represented all electors in the borough.

Population

* Estimate in the 1958 Victorian Year Book.

References

External links
 Victorian Places - Kerang

Kerang Borough
1966 establishments in Australia
Kerang, Victoria